Zoran "Tuta" Živković (born 5 April 1945) is a Serbian former handball coach and player.

Club career
Živković started playing handball at his hometown club Železničar Niš, before moving to Crvenka. He would help them win the national championship in 1969. Later on, Živković played for and served as head coach of FAP. He also spent two seasons with Metaloplastika, before moving abroad to Germany.

International career
At international level, Živković competed for Yugoslavia at the 1972 Summer Olympics, winning the gold medal.

Coaching career
In his second tenure as head coach of FR Yugoslavia, Živković led the team to a third-place finish at the 1999 World Championship. He left his role in December 1999 and took charge of Egypt the same month. After placing seventh in the 2000 Summer Olympics, Živković reached the semi-finals at the 2001 World Championship, losing in the bronze medal match to FR Yugoslavia.

In November 2001, Živković became head coach of FR Yugoslavia for the third time. He led the team at the 2002 European Championship, finishing in a disappointing 10th place. In July 2002, Živković stepped down from his position.

In February 2005, Živković was appointed as head coach by Macedonia for the nation's Euro 2006 qualifiers in June. He would take charge at Macedonian club Vardar during the summer, but left for personal reasons in October of the same year.

In September 2008, Živković was appointed as head coach for Tunisia ahead of the 2009 World Championship. He was dismissed from his position after placing 17th in the tournament.

Honours

Player
Crvenka
 Yugoslav Handball Championship: 1968–69
 Yugoslav Handball Cup: 1966–67
Železničar Niš
 Yugoslav Handball Cup: 1976–77

Coach
Železničar Niš
 Yugoslav Handball Cup: 1976–77, 1984–85
 Handball Cup of FR Yugoslavia: 1996–97, 1998–99

References

External links
 

1945 births
Living people
Sportspeople from Niš
Serbian male handball players
Yugoslav male handball players
Olympic handball players of Yugoslavia
Olympic gold medalists for Yugoslavia
Handball players at the 1972 Summer Olympics
Olympic medalists in handball
Medalists at the 1972 Summer Olympics
Competitors at the 1967 Mediterranean Games
Mediterranean Games gold medalists for Yugoslavia
Mediterranean Games medalists in handball
RK Crvenka players
RK Metaloplastika players
Expatriate handball players
Yugoslav expatriate sportspeople in Germany
Serbian handball coaches
Yugoslav handball coaches
Handball coaches of international teams
Serbian expatriate sportspeople in Tunisia
Serbian expatriate sportspeople in Kuwait